Scholaricine is an alkaloid that has been isolated from Alstonia boonei, a tree of West Africa.

References

Alkaloids
Heterocyclic compounds with 5 rings
Nitrogen heterocycles
Methyl esters